is a district located in Fukushima Prefecture, Japan. As of January 2007, the district has a population of 8,577 and an area of 79.46 km2, for a population density of 107.9 per km2.

Towns and villages 
 Ōtama

History 
 On December 1, 2005, the towns of Adachi, Iwashiro and Tōwa merged into the city of Nihonmatsu.
 On January 1, 2007, the village of Shirasawa and the town of Motomiya merged to form the city of Motomiya, leaving the district.

Prior to the merger, as of 2003, the district had an estimated population of 68,436 and a density of 178.99 persons per km2. The total area was 382.34 km2.

Districts in Fukushima Prefecture
District Adachi